The K-class torpedo boats were a class of three small warships that served in the Dutch Koninklijke Marine. The K stands for 'Klein' (Dutch for 'small'), as these ships were ordered next to the larger , where the G stands for 'Groot' (Dutch for 'big'). The 48-ton ships were ordered in 1904 and commissioned the next year.  saw limited action at the start of World War II during the Battle of the Netherlands in 1940.

Ships

References
 
 

K-class torpedo boats
Ships built in Schiedam
Torpedo boat classes